William Sadler may refer to:

William Sadler (painter) (c.1782–1839), Irish landscape painter
William Sadler (Medal of Honor) (1854–?), American sailor and Medal of Honor recipient
William Sadler (actor) (born 1950), American film and television actor
William S. Sadler (1875–1969), American surgeon and psychiatrist
Billy Sadler (born 1981), American baseball pitcher
William "Bubby" Sadler (1909-1987), American Negro league baseball player
William George "Bill" Sadler (born1931), Canadian race car designer, electrical and electronics engineer, aviation designer.